Ramon Rivas, better known by the stage name Lifeof9000, is an American recording artist and music engineer.

Background

Rivas and his work has been acknowledged and awarded by the Recording Academy for the engineering and co-writing of numerous musical projects, most notably Beyoncé's Lemonade, Jay-Z's Magna Carta Holy Grail, and Ariana Grande's Sweetener album, in addition to other projects involving Cardi B, Alicia Keys, Justin Bieber, Pharrell, Queen Latifah, and Jermaine Dupri.

Rivas has also engineered and/or contributed to musical projects for Nas, Megan Thee Stallion, Kanye West, Drake, Rick Ross, Nicki Minaj, J Balvin, Ed Sheeran, Jennifer Hudson, Destiny's Child, The Dream, Kelly Rowland, Ludacris, Ciara, 50 Cent, T-Pain, N.E.R.D, Clipse, Maxwell, Frank Ocean, Kendrick Lamar, 2 Chainz, Ne-Yo, and Blue Ivy Carter. He has also worked on Indian-style urban production, including projects with Timbaland and Nelly Furtado.

In 2017, Utica-based rapper Trizzy signed Lifeof9000 to his first record deal. In May 2017, Lifeof9000 released his debut EP, Touch My Soul. 

In 2019, Rivas announced the release of his own studio singles, including one with Wu-Tang Clan member Raekwon, amassing coverage in music media.

Honors & Awards

|-
|rowspan="1"|2018
|Sweetener
|Best Pop Album
|
|-
|rowspan="1"|2016
|Lemonade
|Album of the Year
|
|-
|rowspan="1"|2016
|Lemonade
|Record of the Year
|
|-
|rowspan="1"|2016
|Lemonade
|Song of the Year
|
|-
|rowspan="1"|2013
|Magna Carta Holy Grail
|Best Rap/Sung Collaboration
|
|-

References

External links
 Official Twitter

Living people
21st-century American male musicians
Grammy Award winners
Year of birth missing (living people)